NGC 4491 is a dwarf barred spiral galaxy located about 55 million light-years away in the constellation Virgo. NGC 4491 was discovered by astronomer William Herschel on March 15, 1784. NGC 4491 is located in a subgroup of the Virgo Cluster centered on Messier 87 known as the Virgo A subgroup.

Tidal interactions
NGC 4491 is a strongly barred galaxy. The bar may have grown from the tidal influence of other galaxies in the Virgo Cluster.

Possible Seyfert activity
The infrared-radio properties of NGC 4491 possibly suggest the presence of an AGN in the galaxy. However, spectral analysis of the galaxy does not support this view since emission lines are absent or very weak and narrow.

See also
 List of NGC objects (4001–5000)
 Dwarf galaxy

References

External links

Dwarf spiral galaxies
Virgo (constellation)
Barred spiral galaxies
4491
41376
7657
Astronomical objects discovered in 1784
Virgo Cluster